Rosscarrock is a residential neighbourhood in the southwest quadrant of Calgary, Alberta. It is bounded to the north by Bow Trail to the east by 33 Street W, to the south by 17 Avenue S and to the west by 45 Street W. The Westbrook Mall is located in the northeast corner of the neighbourhood, and it is bordered by the Shaganappi golf course.

Rosscarrock was established in 1954. It is represented in the Calgary City Council by the Ward 8 councillor.

Demographics

Residents in this community had a median household income of $65,633 in 2016, and there were 27.6% low income residents living in the neighbourhood. As of 2016, 37% of the residents were immigrants. A proportion of 53.3% of the buildings were condominiums or apartments, and 65.8% of the housing was used for renting.

Education
The community is served by Ernest Manning High and Rosscarrock Elementary public schools, as well as by St. Michael Elementary & Junior High (Catholic, Late French Immersion, International Baccalaureate).

See also
List of neighbourhoods in Calgary

References

External links
Rosscarrock Community Association

Neighbourhoods in Calgary